Arup Das (born 27 July 1991) is an Indian cricketer who plays for Assam in the domestic cricket. He is a right-arm fast-medium bowler. Das made his first-class debut against Jharkhand at Dhanbad in 2011–12 Ranji Trophy. In the quarter-finals of the 2015–16 Ranji Trophy he took 8 wickets for 83 runs.

He was the joint-leading wicket-taker for Assam in the 2017–18 Ranji Trophy, with twelve dismissals in four matches.

References

External links
 
 

1991 births
Living people
Indian cricketers
Assam cricketers
People from Barpeta
Cricketers from Assam